Ne Me Quitte Pas is Jacques Brel's thirteenth studio album. Released in 1972 by Barclay (80145), the album features re-recordings of many of Brel's best-known songs. The album was reissued on 23 September 2003 as part of the 16-CD box set Boîte à Bonbons (Barclay: 980 817-6).

Title song 

The title song has been translated into numerous languages, and has been widely covered by French and English-speaking artists, including Isabelle Aubret (2001), Shirley Bassey (1972), Sam Cooke (1960), Céline Dion (1994), Olivia Newton-John (1972), Nina Simone (1965), Dionne Warwick (1972) and Belinda Carlisle (2007).

Track listing

Personnel 

 Jacques Brel – composer, vocals
 François Rauber – orchestra conductor, arrangements
 Gérard Jouannest – piano
 Gilbert Roussel, Marcel Azzola - accordion on "La valse a mille temps" (uncredited)
 Claude Achallé – audio engineer
 Jean-Marie Guérin – mastering
 Alain Marouani – photography

References 

Jacques Brel albums
1972 albums
Albums conducted by François Rauber
Albums arranged by François Rauber
French-language albums
Barclay (record label) albums
Universal Records albums